Aaron Murphy is an English rugby league footballer who plays for Sheffield Eagles in the Betfred Championship, as a  or .

He previously played for the Wakefield Trinity Wildcats.

Background
Murphy was born in Leeds, West Yorkshire, England.

Career
He commenced his Super League career with Wakefield Trinity in 2008. In 2010, after an injury to the Wakefield Trinity first choice fullback Matt Blaymire, Murphy managed to hold down a regular first team place. In 2012 Murphy moved to the Huddersfield side where he became an integral part of the team, playing a big part in the clubs League Leaders' Shield win in 2013 and subsequent play off campaigns.  At the end of the 2020 season he signed a two-year deal with RFL Championship side Bradford.

References

External links
Huddersfield Giants profile
(archived by web.archive.org) Wakefield Trinity Wildcats profile
Murphy signs new Wakefield deal
SL profile

1988 births
Living people
Bradford Bulls players
English rugby league players
Huddersfield Giants players
Rugby league fullbacks
Rugby league players from Leeds
Sheffield Eagles players
Wakefield Trinity players